Gaolatlhe Godfrey Oliphant (born in Warrenton in the Northern Cape Province) is the current Deputy Minister of Mineral Resources in South Africa, a position he has held since 26 May 2014.

See also

African Commission on Human and Peoples' Rights
Constitution of South Africa
History of the African National Congress
Politics in South Africa
Provincial governments of South Africa

References

Year of birth missing (living people)
Living people
Government ministers of South Africa